Arthur Albert Dixon (July 1867 – 1933) was a footballer who played in the Football League for Aston Villa and Stoke.

Career
Dixon was born in Matlock and played for Derby Midland before joining Aston Villa in August 1888. Dixon made his debut on 15 September 1888 at Wellington Road, at wing-half, in a match against Stoke which Aston Villa won 5–1. He was knocked out during the Stoke game but was fit to play the remaining 2 League games played in September 1888.

He was released at the end of the 1888–89 season and joined Stoke but he failed to make an appearance under Harry Lockett.

Career statistics

References

English footballers
Derby Midland F.C. players
Stoke City F.C. players
Aston Villa F.C. players
English Football League players
1867 births
1933 deaths
Association football wing halves